Colonel Francis William Rhodes  (9 April 1850 – 21 September 1905) is perhaps the best known member of the Rhodes family after his brother Cecil. Trained as a soldier from his youth, he participated in a considerable amount of conflict in different parts of the world. After graduating from the Royal Military College, Sandhurst, he joined the 1st Royal Dragoons in 1873 and served the British Army for 23 years. He participated in the Sudan Campaign, accompanied the Nile Expedition to Khartoum in the abortive effort to relieve General Charles George Gordon, and was present at the battles of El Teb and Tamai. At the Battle of Abu Klea, he distinguished himself when he had several horses shot from under him in the course of the engagement. He was awarded several medals and clasps, including the Distinguished Service Order.

Rhodes filled various staff appointments. From 1890 to 1893, he served as military secretary to Lord Harris while the latter was Governor of Bombay, and in 1893 he was chief of staff on Sir Gerald Herbert Portal's mission to Uganda. Rhodes also served for a brief period as Administrator of Mashonaland and as the appointed military member of the council of four in the government of Matabeleland under Leander Starr Jameson.

The Jameson Raid was perhaps the most trying event in Rhodes's career. He was a leading member of the Reform Committee, in Johannesburg, attempting to liberalise the government of Transvaal Republic President Paul Kruger on behalf of the Uitlander population living in Transvaal. Following the Jameson Raid in December 1895, the members of the Reform Committee were charged with high treason. Rhodes, John Hays Hammond, Douglas Gilfillan and other leaders of the committee were sentenced to death in April 1896. This was later commuted to 15 years' imprisonment, and in June 1896, all members of the committee were released on payment of a heavy fine. As a punishment for his support of Jameson the British Army placed Rhodes on the retired list and barred him from active involvement in army business. After his release from jail, he immediately joined his brother Cecil and the British South Africa Company in the Second Matabele War.

In 1898 he joined Field Marshal Earl Kitchener's Nile expedition as war correspondent for The Times. At the Battle of Omdurman on 2 September he was shot and severely wounded in the right arm. For his services during that campaign he was restored to the army active list. During the Second Boer War, Rhodes continued to work as a war correspondent. He was trapped for the duration in the Siege of Ladysmith and participated in the relief of Mafeking.

With the death of his brother Cecil in 1902, Frank took possession of Dalham Hall, and erected a hall in the village in Cecil's memory. After retiring from the Army in 1903, he served as managing director of the African Trans-Continental Telegraph Company until his death in 1905 in Groote Schuur, Cape Colony.

References

 
 

1851 births
1905 deaths
Military personnel from Hertfordshire
1st The Royal Dragoons officers
British Army personnel of the Mahdist War
British colonial governors and administrators in Africa
British colonial judges in Africa
Companions of the Distinguished Service Order
Companions of the Order of the Bath
Graduates of the Royal Military College, Sandhurst
People convicted of treason
People from Bishop's Stortford
People of the Second Boer War
People of the Second Matabele War
Rhodesian politicians
Transvaal Colony people
Cecil Rhodes
English cricketers
Europeans cricketers